Lupando Mwape ( – 21 January 2019) was a Zambian politician.  He served as the ninth vice-president of Zambia from 2004 to 2006 under President Levy Mwanawasa, who indicated that, had Mwape not been defeated in the 2006 parliamentary election, he would almost certainly have been re-appointed Vice-President. Mwape was succeeded by Rupiah Banda, who became president on Mwanawasa's death in 2008. He died in 2019 at the age of 69. And has a name sake Lupando Chipimo. 

Mwape died in Johannesburg, South Africa in January 2019 at the age of 69.

Education 
 Qualified Bachelor of Engineering and Educationalist in the Technical establishment,
 Aeronautical El,
 Aircraft Maintenance Engineer, Technical and Vocational Lecturer,
 Aircraft Inspector,
 Educational Administrator, Team Leader, Curriculum Development Advisor,
 Examiner and Moderator of Electro-Sciences and Engineering and Aviation Programmes. 
 Started career as an engineer and later an Educationalist and held a degree in Aero - El, Dip. Tech. Education, UK Airworthiness Certificate and possessed an AME Certificate, membership of the Engineering Institute of Zambia (MEIZ) and MBA (Student).

Positions held 
 Elected Member of Parliament. September 2000 
 Appointed Minister of Communications and Transport. And concurrently served as Chairman of Africa Telecommunications Union (ATU); May 2001
 Member of the Zambia National Tender Board (ZNTB); Co-chair of TAZARA Council of Ministers and became Chair from 2002 - 2003;  
 Appointed Northern Province Provincial Minister, between June and October 2004.
 At Party level, was co-opted MMD Northern Province Vice-Chairman in 2001 and became Chairman from April 2003. 
 In October 2004, was co-opted MMD National Trustee until July 2005 and was elected MMD National Trustee the position held until November 2006.  
 Served as Vice President of the Republic of Zambia from October 2004 to October 2006.  
 As Resident Ambassador to P.R. China 2007-2009, Lupando Augustine Festus K. Mwape was a Non-Residential Ambassador to DPR Korea, Kingdom of Thailand, Kingdom of Cambodia, Mongolia, Lao People's Democratic Republic, Vietnam, Pakistan and Afghanistan.

References

"Lupando could have probably succeeded me - Levy"
http://allafrica.com/stories/200611280009.html
HighBeam
https://archive.today/20130421224358/http://www.polity.org.za/topic/augustine-festus-lupando-mwape
http://image.baidu.com/i?tn=baiduimage&ct=201326592&lm=-1&cl=2&nc=1&word=%E5%8D%A2%E6%BD%98%E5%A4%9A%E2%80%A2%E5%A7%86%E7%93%A6%E4%BD%A9&ie=utf-8&ie=utf-8
http://big5.huaxia.com/xw/zdxw/dwjw/2005/00401821.html
http://news.sina.com.cn/o/2005-12-20/20077757300s.shtml
https://web.archive.org/web/20091120034914/http://42.qfmail.com/zsjx/xwzxinfo.php?id=55
http://shenzhensako.cn.gongchang.com/news/206908.html
https://archive.today/20130722081632/http://www.wzfao.gov.cn/view.jsp?id=zb6jnf7a
http://www.sako.cn/news/2009-8-26/122.html
https://archive.today/20130722081617/http://www.cneec.com.cn/news/gsyw/200906/222.html
https://web.archive.org/web/20160305051630/http://zwxws.net/news/2009106.asp
https://archive.today/20130722081638/http://xdjt.com.cn/news_show.asp?tid=4&id=355
https://archive.today/20130722081522/http://www.invest.net.cn/swzx/zambia/xxzx/second-5.htm

https://web.archive.org/web/20160304034630/http://www.jsfao.gov.cn/newsdetail.asp?newsid=12208
http://newpaper.dahe.cn/dhcf/html/2011-01/11/content_449589.htm
https://web.archive.org/web/20160304035906/http://www.hainan.gov.cn/data/news/2007/06/32955/
https://archive.today/20130722081629/http://qys.miit.gov.cn/n11293472/n11295074/n11298763/12450304.html
http://news.travel168.net/20060112/3119.html

http://mg.co.za/article/2005-03-21-zambias-vicepresident-threatens-to-quit

See also
List of vice presidents of Zambia

2019 deaths
Vice-presidents of Zambia
Movement for Multi-Party Democracy politicians
Ambassadors of Zambia
Year of birth uncertain
1950s births